HH Shiekh Jassim bin Muhammed Al Thani is a member of the Qatari royal family who was the founder and minister of electricity and water from 1970 to 1989. He was born in 1914 in Umm Salal, eldest son of Shiekh Mohammed bin Jassim Al Thani and Her Highness Sheikha Aisha bint Ahmed Al Fikani Al Thani. He married six times as he was a royal. His successors are known as Shiekh Khalifa bin jassim Al Fikani Al Thani, and Shiekh Khalil bin jassim Al Fikani Al Thani. His grandchildren include Sheikh Iyan bin khalil Al Fikani, Sheikh Eissa bin khalil Al Fikani, Sheikha Ghada bint Khalifa Al Thani, Skeikha Rowda bint Khalifa Al Thani, Sheikha Maha bint Khalifa Al Thani, and Sheikha Sara bint khalifa Al Thani.

References

Al Thani Tree

Government ministers of Qatar
House of Thani
1914 births
Year of death missing